This is a summary of 1990 in music in the United Kingdom, including the official charts from that year.

Summary
The first year of the 1990s saw a total of 17 singles top the chart. The first, "Hangin' Tough" by the boyband New Kids on the Block, which became the group's second chart-topper, set the record for lowest first-week sales for a number 1, with only 28,000 copies sold. Although January is usually a low sales month due to it being post-Christmas season, the vinyl single had been in severe decline in the UK since the late 1980s. In 1990 New Kids on the Block released a total of three albums and six singles (not including "Hangin' Tough") during the course of the year. Although their third album Step by Step topped the charts, their follow-up debut eponymous album was re-released and made only number six. The six singles released after their chart-topper in January all failed to top the charts, though four did make the top 5, the most successful, "Step By Step", reaching number two.

The next No. 1 was Kylie Minogue's cover of the Little Anthony & the Imperials song "Tears on My Pillow", taken from the film The Delinquents, which became her fourth number one single in the UK and the final number one for production team Stock Aitken Waterman. Her album release for the year Rhythm of Love made number 9 on the UK Albums Chart with the lead single "Better the Devil You Know" making number two.

Despite the huge success experienced by Stock Aitken Waterman the previous four years, 1990 saw a sharp decline in the popularity of their songs. With Jason Donovan's chart positions rapidly declining, both Sonia and Big Fun were dropped, Donna Summer reportedly fell-out with the trio and only Lonnie Gordon was able to go Top 10 with her number 4 single "Happenin' All Over Again", a song originally intended for Donna Summer. Kylie Minogue ended her run of Top 2's when "Step Back in Time" stalled at number 4, and new songs by Hazell Dean, Pat and Mick and Sybil missed the chart completely. Mike Stock revealed in his book "The Hit Factory" he felt it was Pete Waterman's fault their popularity plummeted after the outspoken Producer made several scathing attacks about the British Music Industry to the press. By the end of the year, rumours began circulating about unrest in the PWL camp and, next year, Matt Aitken would be the first to depart.

The continued success of Kylie, and the Australian soap opera's Neighbours on BBC 1 and Home and Away on ITV, saw more actors releasing singles this year in the hope of replicating the success of Kylie and Jason Donovan. The most successful of these was Craig McLachlan (who notably appeared in both series) and his band Check 1–2 who scored a number 2 in the spring with "Mona" and went Top 20 with its follow-up, "Amanda".

Madonna scored her 7th number 1 single with "Vogue", from her hit album I'm Breathless which made No. 2, charting in the same position as her follow-up single "Hanky Panky". Her album success did not end there, however, with The Immaculate Collection (greatest hits release) becoming her most successful album ever, topping the UK albums chart for 9 weeks and selling 3.6 million copies in the UK (10th best selling album of all-time) and promotional single "Justify My Love" giving her a second No. 2 hit, whose video caused some controversy and was banned from MTV.

Showing something of a revival in popularity this year were Belinda Carlisle who followed three tracks that barely made the top 40 with a remix of a track from her 1989 album Runaway Horses, "(We Want) The Same Thing", which made number six. The album was subsequently re-released, peaking at the same position it had before, number four, and "Summer Rain" became the sixth and final hit from the album, making number 23 in December. Another comeback was from Elton John who got his first solo number 1 in June, and only his second overall (his first being "Don't Go Breaking My Heart" with Kiki Dee in 1976) with the charity single "Sacrifice"/"Healing Hands", with all the proceeds going to AIDS charities. Both tracks had previously failed to reach the top 40 when they were originally released in 1989, but significant airplay on Radio 2 ensured the songs were re-issued and became massive hits. He also enjoyed success with two number 1 albums, Sleeping With the Past in July, and The Very Best of Elton John in November. The latter went on to sell 2.7 million copies in the UK, becoming the 17th-best-selling album of all-time.

An obscure British house-dance act DNA revived Suzanne Vega's fortunes this year with a smash hit remix of 1987 album track "Tom's Diner" which peaked at number two in July. The track was an international hit, peaking in the top 10 all over the world. European dance music was one of the most popular genres of the year, with several songs of that type hitting number 1, including, from Germany, Snap!'s "The Power", the last record to jump from outside the top 10 to number 1 until 2006, discounting imports. Although their album, World Power, made only number 21 upon initial release, Snap went on to have a further three top 10 singles, "Ooops Up" (No.5, June), "Cult of Snap" (No.8, October) and "Mary Had a Little Boy" (No.8, December) and this caused the album to re-chart and peak at number 10.

Belgian house music was very popular in 1990 with artists like Technotronic powering the charts with songs like No.2 smash "Get Up ! (Before the Night Is Over)" and "Rockin' Over the Beat", a big summer No.9 hit, and finally a "Megamix" rounded off the year, making number 6 in October. From Italy, 49ers scored two of the biggest dance hits of the year; "Touch Me" peaked at number 3, and the follow-up, "Don't You Love Me", which contained a sample from Jody Watley's song "Don't You Want Me", made number 12. Meanwhile, Dutch trio Twenty 4 Seven hit the Top 20 twice with their two hits, "I Can't Stand It" (No.7) and "Are You Dreaming" (No.17); both tracks were fronted by US rapper, Captain Hollywood.

Manchester in the UK was the base of 808 State who scored two Top 10 hits this year, one with fellow Mancunian rapper MC Tunes, "The Only Rhyme That Bites", and one on their own, "Cubik/Olympic", both tracks reached No.10.  Londonbeat hit the charts in the summer of 1990 with "I've Been Thinking About You" and The Adventures Of Stevie V released the summer anthem of 1990 "Dirty Cash" which reached No.2 in July. The KLF, who were formerly in the charts as The Timelords back in 1988, had a huge club and chart comeback with "What Time is Love?" which made No.5 in September. This started a successful run of hits that continued through to 1992.

A problem occurred in September when two records – The Steve Miller Band's "The Joker" and Deee-Lite's "Groove Is in the Heart" – both tied for the number one position, selling exactly the same number of copies. As the rules stated that in the event of this happening, the single which had climbed the highest would be the number 1, "The Joker", re-issued after being featured in a Levi's advert, won out (having climbed five places instead of three). Due to the controversy that followed, with some saying that it was unfair to let a re-issue of an old song overtake the debut single of a new group, the rules were changed so that records would now be allowed to tie.

Four of the number ones this year came from films. Kylie Minogue's "Tears on My Pillow", mentioned earlier, Partners In Kryme's "Turtle Power", from Teenage Mutant Ninja Turtles, Maria McKee's "Show Me Heaven", from Days of Thunder, and a re-issue of The Righteous Brothers' "Unchained Melody" (originally a number 14 hit in 1965) from Ghost, which was the biggest selling single of the year. A re-issue of the 1965 No. 1 "You've Lost That Lovin' Feelin'" in December was also successful, peaking at #3.

Cliff Richard scored the Christmas number one single with "Saviour's Day", his 13th number one, and his 100th top 40 hit. With this he became the only person to have a number one in the 1950s, 60s, 70s, 80s, and 90s.

Merseyside composer John McCabe produced a flute concerto, written for James Galway and premièred by the London Symphony Orchestra who had commissioned it; it was not recorded until 1999.  Another Lancashire composer, John Pickard, produced his best-known work The Flight of Icarus.  Simon Rattle became musical director of the City of Birmingham Symphony Orchestra, of which he had been Principal Conductor since 1980.

Events
18 February - Fine Young Cannibals win 2 Brit awards, but they soon return them in protest after a video message from Maggie Thatcher appeared at the ceremony.
12 April - The Stone Roses are fined £6,000 for causing damage and vandalism to the offices of their former label, FM Revolver, after the band took offence to a video their former label made for the re-release of their "Sally Cinnamon" single
27 May - The Stone Roses play an outdoor concert at Spike Island in Widnes, Cheshire.  
1 August - UB40 are deported from Seychelles after being arrested on suspicion of marijuana possession.
9 October - Radio stations worldwide play "Imagine" by John Lennon, honouring him on what would have been his 50th birthday.
3 December - Ibbs and Tillett goes into voluntary liquidation.

Charts

Number-one singles

Number-one albums

Year end charts

Best-selling singles of 1990

Best-selling artist albums of 1990

Notes:

Classical music
John Rutter - Magnificat
Colin Matthews - Strugnell's Haiku

Opera
Jonathan Dove - Hastings Spring
John Metcalf - Tornrak
Judith Weir - The Vanishing Bridegroom

Births
1 February - Laura Marling, singer-songwriter (Noah and the Whale)
17 February - Alex Banfield, operatic tenor
29 April - Loick Essien, singer
17 June - Laura Wright, singer (All Angels)
11 July - George Craig, English singer-songwriter and model (One Night Only)
12 July - Maverick Sabre, singer-songwriter
18 July - Dan Croll, singer-songwriter (Eye Emma Jedi)
24 July - Jay McGuiness, English singer 
4 September - Danny Worsnop, singer-songwriter (Asking Alexandria and We Are Harlot)
17 September - Pixie Geldof, model and singer, daughter of Bob Geldof and Paula Yates
26 November
 Rita Ora, singer
 Chip, rapper

Deaths
18 January - Melanie Appleby, singer and dancer (Mel and Kim), 23
19 January - Alberto Semprini, pianist, conductor and composer, 81
12 March - Harry South, jazz pianist, composer and arranger, 60
6 June – Joe Loss, bandleader, 80
16 June – Dame Eva Turner, operatic soprano, 98
21 June - Elizabeth Harwood, operatic soprano, 52 (cancer)
16 July - Sidney Torch, pianist, organist, conductor, arranger and composer, 82
12 August - Roy Williamson, Scottish songwriter, musician, (The Corries), writer of "Flower of Scotland", 54
28 August - Pamela Harrison, pianist, music teacher and composer, 74 (car accident)
25 September - Wilfred Burns, film composer, 73
4 October - Alyn Ainsworth, conductor, 66
13 November - Richard Lewis, operatic tenor, 76
date unknown - Leslie Osborne, composer of TV and radio themes, 85

Music awards

Brit Awards
The 1990 Brit Awards winners were:

Best British producer: Dave Stewart
Best classical recording: Simon Rattle – George Gershwin's – "Porgy And Bess"
Best international artist: Neneh Cherry
Best music video: The Cure – "Lullaby"
Best soundtrack: "Batman"
British album: Fine Young Cannibals – "The Raw and the Cooked"
British breakthrough act: Lisa Stansfield
British female solo artist: Annie Lennox
British group: Fine Young Cannibals
British male solo artist: Phil Collins
British single: Phil Collins – "Another Day in Paradise"
International breakthrough act: Neneh Cherry
International group: U2
Outstanding contribution: Queen

See also
 1990 in British radio
 1990 in British television
 1990 in the United Kingdom
 List of British films of 1990

References

External links
 BBC Radio 1's Chart Show
 The Official Charts Company

 
British music
Music
British music by year